The Lunar Cruiser is a crewed pressurized rover being developed jointly by JAXA and Toyota that astronauts can drive on the Moon. The Lunar Cruiser is being developed as a part of NASA's Artemis Program and will enable astronaut crews to take trips across the Moon lasting up to 45 days. Named after the Toyota Land Cruiser, its name was chosen "because of the familiar feeling it offers the people involved in the development and manufacture of the vehicle prototype as part of the joint research project as well as the familiarity it will provide the general public." The rover is currently being manufactured, with an expected launch date in the latter half of the 2020s. The rover itself will use fuel-cell electric-vehicle technologies.

References

Lunar rovers
Missions to the Moon